Esfangareh is a village in Qurigol Rural District, in the Central District of Bostanabad County, East Azerbaijan Province, Iran. At the 2006 census, its population was 108, in 23 families.

References 

Populated places in Bostanabad County